Frederick George Rumball (December 8, 1853 – October 1, 1940) was a Canadian lumber merchant and politician in Ontario, Canada. He served as mayor of London, Ontario from 1900 to 1901.

The son of Benjamin Rumball and Mary Johnson, both natives of England, he was born in Clinton, Huron County, Canada West. Rumball was educated there and apprenticed as a carpenter, later working as a general contractor and then entering the lumber business. He moved to London in 1881. Rumball was president of the Columbia Handle Company, the Southwestern Traction Company, the Monarch Fire Insurance Company of Canada and the Hourde Manufacturing Company. He was first elected to London city council in 1897, serving for two years. He was an unsuccessful candidate for the London seat in the Ontario Legislative Assembly in 1905.

Rumball was married twice: first to Agnes Aikenhead in 1878 and then to A. A. Perdue in 1902.

Rumball died in London at the Victoria Hospital at the age of 86.

His great-great-grandson is Rick Nicholls, a politician for the provincial riding of Chatham-Kent—Leamington (formerly Chatham-Kent-Essex), who served as the Deputy Speaker of the House from June 2018 – 2021.

References 

1853 births
1940 deaths
Mayors of London, Ontario